Archibald W. Riddell (1864 – 1945) was a farmer and political figure in Saskatchewan. He represented Souris in the Legislative Assembly of Saskatchewan from 1908 to 1912 as a Provincial Rights Party member.
He was born in Burns, Ontario, the son of George Riddell. In 1887, Riddell married Katherine Strachan. He lived in Oxbow, Saskatchewan.

References 

Saskatchewan Provincial Rights Party MLAs
1864 births
1945 deaths